The 1860 United States presidential election in Delaware took place on November 6, 1860, as part of the 1860 United States presidential election. State voters chose three representatives, or electors, to the Electoral College, who voted for president and vice president.

Delaware was won by the 14th Vice President of the United States John C. Breckinridge (SD–Kentucky), running with Senator Joseph Lane, with 45.54% of the popular vote, against Senator John Bell (CU–Tennessee), running with the Governor of Massachusetts Edward Everett, with 24.13% of the popular vote, Illinois Representative Abraham Lincoln (R–Kentucky), running with Senator Hannibal Hamlin, with 23.72% of the popular vote and the 15th Senator Stephen A. Douglas (D–Vermont), running with 41st Governor of Georgia Herschel V. Johnson, with 6.61% of the popular vote.

Results

*In this county where Lincoln ran ahead of Bell, margin given is Breckinridge vote minus Lincoln vote and percentage margin Breckinridge percentage minus Lincoln percentage.

See also
 United States presidential elections in Delaware

References

Delaware
1860
1860 Delaware elections